Kasam Paida Karne Wale Ki is a 1984 Indian Hindi-language masala film produced and directed by Babbar Subhash, starring Mithun Chakraborty (in double role), Smita Patil, Salma Agha, Karan Razdan, Geeta Siddharth and Amrish Puri. It was remade in Tamil as Mangamma Sabadham (1985).

Plot
Satish Kumar is the only heir to a vast estate, managed by his uncle Udaybhan Singh. Udaybhan has conditioned Satish from childhood to be afraid of him, and this fear persists into Satish's adulthood, leaving him unable to stand up for himself.

Satish is devastated to learn that his wife Aarti had married him only to rob him of cash and jewels. Aarti is thrown out by Udaybhan, but Satish goes after her and they reconcile. Udaybhan kills Satish and convinces the police it was suicide. Aarti swears vengeance via Satish's unborn son whom she is pregnant with.

Years later, Udaybhan is now living with his son Chandrabhan in the mansion formerly owned by Satish, when Aarti and her grown son Avinash surface again. Avinash files a court case to prove his paternity from Satish, but due to an outburst in court is jailed briefly. Avinash's girlfriend Neena gets Chandrabhan drunk and records him on audio admitting that Udaybhan killed Satish.

Avinash plays the recording to Udaybhan in an attempt to make Udaybhan confess to the police, but Udaybhan kidnaps Neena instead and Avinash has to rescue her. Avinash then kidnaps Chandrabhan to make Udaybhan confess, but Udaybhan kidnaps Aarti and Neena and also kills Avinash's aunt. Udaybhan arranges with Avinash for a hostage exchange. After getting back Chandrabhan in the exchange, Udaybhan attempts to kill Neena and Aarti. A huge fight scene ensues, during which Chandrabhan and all their henchmen are killed. Avinash kills Udaybhan with the same knife that Udaybhan killed Satish with, thereby completing Aarti's vengeance. Avinash and Neena celebrate romantically.

Cast 
 Mithun Chakraborty as Satish Kumar and Avinash S. Kumar
 Smita Patil as Aarti S. Kumar
 Salma Agha as Neena
 Amrish Puri as Udaybhan Singh
 Gita Siddharth as Satish's Daimaa
 Jagdish Raj as Judge
 Karan Razdan as Chanderbhan U. Singh
 Master Subramanium as Child Mithun Chakraborty
 Bob Christo as Udaybhan's Assistant

Soundtrack

Popular culture
Kasam Paida Karne Wale Ki features a dance sequence called Jeena Bhi Kya Hai Jeena Teri Ankhon Ke Bina clearly modeled on Michael Jackson's video "Thriller", in which the ghoulish characters do a synchronised dance in a graveyard. The soundtrack of this song is inspired by Michael Jackson's "Billie Jean".

The film has recently gained attention for the filmi funk/jazz/soul song "Come Closer", produced by Bappi Lahiri and sung by the film's actress Salma Agha. The song has been sampled in various (particularly hip hop) songs in recent years, including "My Life" (2006) by Dabrye featuring Showbiz and A.G., "The Medicine" (2006) by Planet Asia, "The Hitman (Kutmasta Kurt Remix)" (2006) by Create & Devastate featuring Masta Ace and Stricklin (2006), "Saanks Mä Murista Sun Muffinssiin" (2008) by Edu Kehäkettunen and DJPP featuring Stig Dogg, "Cattivi e buoni" (2006) by Club Dogo and Come Closer (2009) by Onra. It also features in the movie Lion.

Box office
The film was released on 15 November 1984 at the budget of (₹1.40 cr). Opening day it collected (₹16 lkh) and opening week it collected (₹1.23 cr). India net box office collections were (₹3.56 cr) and worldwide gross collections were (₹5.50 cr). Overseas gross collection's were (₹5.50 cr) and it was Superhit at Box Office India

It was rated at 5.7/10 stars it was ninth highest grossing film of India.

References

External links 
 

1980s Hindi-language films
1980s masala films
1984 films
Cultural depictions of Michael Jackson
Films directed by Babbar Subhash
Films scored by Bappi Lahiri
Hindi films remade in other languages